Nature Structural & Molecular Biology is a monthly peer-reviewed scientific journal publishing research articles, reviews, news, and commentaries in structural and molecular biology, with an emphasis on papers that further a "functional and mechanistic understanding of how molecular components in a biological process work together". 

It is published by the Nature Portfolio and was established in 1994 under the title Nature Structural Biology, obtaining its current title in January 2004. Like other Nature journals, there is no external editorial board, with editorial decisions being made by an in-house team, although peer review by external expert referees forms a part of the review process.

According to the Journal Citation Reports, the journal had a 2020 impact factor of 15.369, ranking it 13th out of 298 journals in the category "Biochemistry & Molecular Biology", 1st out of 72 journals in the category "Biophysics", and 16th out of 195 journals in the category "Cell Biology".

References

External links
 
 

Biochemistry journals
Publications established in 1994
Nature Research academic journals
Monthly journals
English-language journals